Parsaram Meghwal (born 30 October 1954) was an Indian politician and a former Member of Parliament for the constituency of Jalore in Rajasthan.

References

India MPs 1996–1997
Lok Sabha members from Rajasthan
Living people
1954 births
People from Jalore district
Indian National Congress politicians from Rajasthan